James Friend is a British cinematographer, best known for his work on Edward Berger's All Quiet on the Western Front, which earned him the Academy Award for Best Cinematography, in addition to the BAFTA Award for Best Cinematography.

Friend grew up in Maidstone, Kent, where he attended Sutton Valence School.
He was awarded a Fellowship from the Royal Photographic Society for his film work in 2020. 

Friend's television credits include Patrick Melrose and Your Honor, both of which he collaborated on with Berger. His current upcoming project is the Disney+ series The Acolyte, an instalment in the Star Wars franchise.

Filmography
Film

Television

References

External links
 

Living people
Best Cinematographer Academy Award winners
British cinematographers
Year of birth missing (living people)
People from Maidstone
Best Cinematography BAFTA Award winners
People educated at Sutton Valence School